Tony Harper is an American football coach.  He served as the head football coach at Dakota Wesleyan University in Mitchell, South Dakota from 2002 to 2004 Hastings College in Hastings, Nebraska from 2011 to 2020. Harper was the defensive coordinator at Hastings from 2006 to 2010.

After Hastings parted ways with Harper following the 2020 season, he joined the staff at Grand Island Northwest High School in Grand Island, Nebraska as the defensive coordinator.

Head coaching record

References

Year of birth missing (living people)
Living people
Concordia Cougars football coaches
Dana Vikings football coaches
Dakota Wesleyan Tigers football coaches
Doane Tigers football coaches
Missouri Valley Vikings football coaches
Hastings Broncos football coaches
Concordia University Chicago alumni
Doane University alumni